Jodia (also spelled Jodiya) is a town in Jamnagar district, Gujarat, India. Jodia was the well-known port of India before 1947. It has a sainik school located at Balachadi. It is the birthplace of Gunateet Swami. There is a clothes and a fish market.

Future Development
Gujarat Water Infrastructure Limited (GWIL) has signed an MOU with Essel InfraProjects to develop a 100 million liters per day (MLD) seawater desalination plant at the port of Jodia. This treatment plant will provide water for to the water grid of Gujarat for the next 25 years. The project will boost supplies to Jamnagar, Rajkot and Morbi cities along with the other adjoining areas.

References

Cities and towns in Jamnagar district
Ports and harbours of Gujarat